There are several stadiums in Romania with the name Stadionul Unirea:

 Stadionul Unirea (Dej)
 Stadionul Unirea (Sânnicolau Mare)
 Stadionul Unirea (Tărlungeni)